A voiced alveolar affricate is a type of affricate consonant pronounced with the tip or blade of the tongue against the alveolar ridge (gum line) just behind the teeth.  This refers to a class of sounds, not a single sound.  There are several types with significant perceptual differences:
The voiced alveolar sibilant affricate  is the most common type, similar to the ds in English lads.
The voiced alveolar non-sibilant affricate , or  using the alveolar diacritic from the Extended IPA, is found, for example, in some dialects of English and Italian.
The voiced alveolar lateral affricate  is found, for example, in Xhosa.
The voiced alveolar retracted sibilant affricate 
This article discusses the first two.

Voiced alveolar sibilant affricate

The voiced alveolar sibilant affricate is a type of consonantal sound used in some spoken languages.

Features
Features of the voiced alveolar sibilant affricate:

The stop component of this affricate is laminal alveolar, which means it is articulated with the blade of the tongue at the alveolar ridge. For simplicity, this affricate is usually called after the sibilant fricative component.
There are at least three specific variants of the fricative component:
 Dentalized laminal alveolar (commonly called "dental"), which means it is articulated with the tongue blade very close to the upper front teeth, with the tongue tip resting behind lower front teeth.
 Non-retracted alveolar, which means it is articulated with either the tip or the blade of the tongue at the alveolar ridge, termed respectively apical and laminal.
 Retracted alveolar, which means it is articulated with either the tip or the blade of the tongue slightly behind the alveolar ridge, termed respectively apical and laminal.

Occurrence
The following sections are named after the fricative component.

Dentalized laminal alveolar

Non-retracted alveolar

Retracted alveolar

Variable

Voiced alveolar non-sibilant affricate

Features

Occurrence

See also 
 Voiced dental affricate
 List of phonetics topics

Notes

References

External links
 

Alveolar consonants
Affricates
Pulmonic consonants
Voiced oral consonants
Central consonants